Georges Paulmier (24 December 1882, in Frepillon – 30 December 1956, in Chateaudin) was a French professional road bicycle racer, who won two stages in the early Tours de France.

Major results

1908
Tour de France: Winner 10th stage
1910
Tour de France: Winner 8th stage

External links 

French male cyclists
French Tour de France stage winners
1882 births
1956 deaths
Sportspeople from Val-d'Oise
Cyclists from Île-de-France